Igor Gorokhov (Russian: Игорь Олегович Горохов; born November 28, 1990) is a Russian former professional ice hockey defenceman.

Gorokhov played 34 games for Amur Khabarovsk of the Kontinental Hockey League (KHL) during the 2009–10 KHL season.

References

External links

1990 births
Living people
Amur Khabarovsk players
HC Kuban players
Russian ice hockey defencemen
PSK Sakhalin players
Sportspeople from Novosibirsk
Sputnik Nizhny Tagil players
Yermak Angarsk players
Yuzhny Ural Orsk players